Lev Kublanov (born September 9, 1946) is a modern Russian-American graphic artist. His works are primarily in the realism style, though sometimes with elements of the magic realism. His main subjects are landscapes, still life, and portraits using pen and ink, charcoal, pencil, sepia, gouache and watercolor.

Life and work

Lev Kublanov was born in Moscow, Russia, and spent his childhood in a historic neighborhood near the Red Square. He graduated from the Moscow Architectural Institute in 1972; he consequently worked for 20 years in various Moscow architectural design firms and became a member of the Architects’ Union of the USSR. He has been a member of the International Union of Architects since 1981. In 1985, tired of designing monotonous mass-apartment buildings and offices, Kublanov left architecture to become a graphic artist. Since then, he has participated in personal and group exhibitions in Russia, Western Europe, and USA. His works can be found in private collections all over the world, including Russia, Austria, Hungary, Germany, USA, Israel, Italy, Poland, France and Japan.

While in Moscow, Kublanov's work captured the ancient Moscow spirit, mirroring the reality of the old city: ancient courtyards, quiet streets, and the feeling of everyday life. Kublanov's architectural background gives his work a precision, clearly articulated composition, and the illusion of distance. He does not strive for generalization or for the abstract rather, he allows his emotions and observations to develop a poetic image of his subject. His landscapes are uninhabited but one senses their human creator. His work strikes a responsive chord in all people who find their world being destroyed by modern technology.

In 1998, Lev Kublanov and his family moved to Chicago. Being invited to southwest Michigan, he created a series of drawings and watercolors for Schuler’s Restaurant in Stevensville, MI.

Exhibitions

Moscow, Russia

1987,1993      State Central Library
1987           Cultural Center on Volhonka Street
1988,1992      Nekrasov’s Library
1988,1995,1997 Central House of Architects
1990           Art Center on Kuznetsky
1997           Hotel «Ukraina»
1997           «Peresvetov Pereulok» Gallery
1998           Moscow Division of IBM
1996,1998      Central House of Journalists
1998           Center for Liberal Democracy

France

Permanent Exhibition at Art Gallery «Mareschall», Paris

Germany

1994 Gallery «Eckes», Nieder-Olm

Austria

Permanent Exhibition at Cultural Center of Mondsee
1991,1992 Gallery «Forum», Wels
1993,1994,1997,1999 Gallery of Bank, Kirchdorf

United States

1998,1999 Lincoln Terrace Art Studio & Gallery, Skokie, IL
2000 MILLENNIUM Art Gallery, Libertyville, IL
2001 CURTIS FRAME Back Alley Gallery, Libertyville, IL
2000,2001 The Rose Gallery, Chicago, IL
2008 UBU Fine Art Gallery, Chicago, IL

References
 Tatiana Kuzovleva, "At the pale where eternity is a trice: A few strokes to portray Lev Kublanov", Weekly magazine "Culture", #17(7128), May 14–20, 1998 Portal Culture (in Russian)

Further reading
 Daily Herald, January 16, 2003. Russian immigrant to display Arlington Heights-inspired art.
 Kommersant, #42(265), March 9, 1993 (in Russian)

External links
 Lev Kublanov's website
 Ubu Fine Art Gallery, Chicago

Modern painters
20th-century American painters
American male painters
21st-century American painters
21st-century American male artists
20th-century Russian painters
Russian male painters
21st-century Russian painters
Living people
1946 births
Artists from Chicago
20th-century American male artists
20th-century Russian male artists
21st-century Russian male artists